Veterans Parkway (also known as Southwest Bypass) is a  long freeway in the Savannah metropolitan area, connecting Georgetown with downtown Savannah, completely within Chatham County. It is not a state route, nor is it maintained by the Georgia Department of Transportation (GDOT); it is one of a handful of county-maintained freeways in Georgia. Other county maintained freeways include Ronald Reagan Parkway, Harry S. Truman Parkway, and a portion of the East–West Connector in Cobb County. Most of the route parallels Hunter Army Airfield (Hunter AAF), which is located to the east of the highway. At its northern terminus, Interstate 516 (I-516) east and State Route 21 (SR 21) south provides access to Hunter AAF. On SR 204 it is not signed as Veterans Parkway, it is signed "To Downtown Savannah".

Route description 

Veterans Parkway begins at an interchange with SR 204 (Abercorn Street) in Georgetown. It curves to the northeast, crossing over the Little Ogeechee River. The highway curves to the north to an interchange with Chatham Parkway. Then, it curves to a nearly-due-east routing to meet its northern terminus, an interchange with I-516/SR 21 (William F. Lynes Parkway) on the southwestern edge of downtown Savannah.

All of Veterans Parkway is included as part of the National Highway System, a system of roadways important to the nation's economy, defense, and mobility.

History 

Veterans Parkway was established in 1996 along the same alignment as it runs today.

Exit list

See also

References

External links

Transportation in Chatham County, Georgia
Roads in Savannah, Georgia
Freeways in the United States